Gaëlle Hermet (born 12 June, 1996) is a  French rugby union player who plays as a winger for the France women's national rugby union team and Stade Toulousain. Hermet first captained France at the age of 21.

Career
Hermet won her first cap for France in 2016 and was named captain of the national team in November 2017. She led the team to their grand-slam winning Women's Six Nations Championship campaign in 2018 and that year she was nominated for the World Rugby’s Women’s Player of the Year award. In 2022, She was named as captain of France's team for the delayed 2021 Rugby World Cup in New Zealand.

Personal life
Hermet studied psychology at the University of Toulouse-Jean Jaurès before going on to study occupational health. She works at a nursing home in Cadours alongside her rugby and during the COVID-19 pandemic was working full time in the care sector.

References

1996 births
Living people
French female rugby union players